This list of Ports and harbours in Djibouti details the ports, harbours around the coast of Djibouti.

List of ports and harbours in Djibouti

External links

References

Ports

Djibouti